Mohammad Ganjkhanlou (born 4 July 1997) is an Iranian cyclist, who most recently rode for UCI Continental team .

Major results

2015
 National Junior Road Championships
1st  Road race
2nd Time trial
 Asian Junior Road Championships
3rd Time trial
5th Road race
2016
 National Road Championships
1st  Under-23 road race
3rd Road race
3rd Under-23 time trial
 3rd Road race, Asian Under-23 Road Championships
2017
 3rd Road race, Asian Under-23 Road Championships
 4th Time trial, National Road Championships
2018
 Tour of Iran (Azerbaijan)
1st Stages 1 & 6
1st  Points classification
 2nd Road race, Asian Under-23 Road Championships
 6th Overall Tour of Mevlana
1st  Points classification
1st Stage 3
2019
 1st Road race, Asian Under-23 Road Championships
 National Under-23 Road Championships
1st  Road race
2nd Time trial
 1st Stage 7 Tour de Singkarak
 2nd Overall Tour de Siak
2021
 2nd Road race, National Road Championships
 5th Grand Prix Erciyes
2022
 1st  Road race, Islamic Solidarity Games
 Asian Road Championships
3rd  Team time trial
9th Road race
 Asian Track Championships
3rd  Omnium
3rd  Scratch

References

External links

1997 births
Living people
Iranian male cyclists
Cyclists at the 2018 Asian Games
Asian Games competitors for Iran
21st-century Iranian people
Islamic Solidarity Games competitors for Iran